Emil Wecksten (28 August 1895 – 20 December 1985) was a Finnish wrestler. He competed in the Greco-Roman light heavyweight event at the 1924 Summer Olympics.

References

External links
 

1895 births
1985 deaths
Olympic wrestlers of Finland
Wrestlers at the 1924 Summer Olympics
Finnish male sport wrestlers
People from Kirkkonummi
Sportspeople from Uusimaa